"Moi... Lolita" (English: "Me... Lolita") is the debut single by French singer Alizée, released in July 2000 from her debut studio album, Gourmandises (2000). The single topped the charts in Italy and Spain, while reaching the top five in Austria, Belgium, France, Germany and the Netherlands.

Background

In 1999, Alizée appeared on the M6 channel's talent show Graines de star. Initially she intended to sign up for the programme's dance contest, but that category was reserved for groups only. Alizée therefore joined the singing category instead, performing the song "Waiting for Tonight" by Jennifer Lopez and "Ma Prière" (a single released by Axelle Red in 1997). She went on to win the Meilleure Graine award for most promising young singing star of tomorrow.

Her winning performance was seen by veteran songwriters Mylène Farmer and Laurent Boutonnat, who were looking for a young, fresh voice to partake in their new project. They approached Alizée, and she was selected after studio auditions.

Composition

The song was instrumental in showcasing Alizée's image as that of a seductive Lolita character, referring to the novel by Vladimir Nabokov.

The lyrics to the song also make several references to the songwriter, Mylène Farmer.

Critical reception
Peter Robinson from NME highly acclaimed the song, stated: "It’s pop as pop should be: the perfect marriage of innocence and experience of which the French, from Birkin to Paradis, have always seemed overwhelmingly capable. All this plus it has one of the most electrifying middle eights ever committed to record."

Commercial performance
In France, "Moi... Lolita" peaked at number two for 13 weeks, being unable to dislodge "Les Rois du monde" by Gregori Baquet, Damien Sargue and Philippe D'Avilan which topped the chart then. It stayed in the top five for 24 consecutive weeks, and when Alizée's following single "L'Alizé" reached number one, "Moi... Lolita" was still at the number-three position. The song was certified gold two months after its release by the Syndicat National de l'Édition Phonographique. In the United Kingdom the song was acclaimed by the NME who recognised it with a "Single of the Week" award. It became a rare example of a foreign-language song to chart highly in the UK, peaking at number nine.

Music video
The video for the single was directed by Laurent Boutonnat and was first premiered on 26 July 2000 on M6.

The video is about Alizée in a nightclub dancing and having fun. In the first part of the video Alizée is running away from a man who professes his love for her and gives her a money bill when she asks for it. Later, she flees from her abusive mother, with her little sister, to a nightclub and starts to dance. The video ends with Alizée and the little girl leaving and the man from the beginning following them.

Uses in the media
 The song was used in Ridley Scott's film A Good Year in both the trailer and in the film.

Track listings
 CD single - France
 "Moi... Lolita" (single version)
 "Moi... Lolita" (the piano version)

 CD single - UK
 "Moi... Lolita" (single version) — 4:16
 "Moi... Lolita" (Lola extended remix) — 6:30
 "Moi... Lolita" (Illicit full vocal mix) — 8:05
 "Moi... Lolita" (CD rom video) — 4:50

 CD maxi - Germany
 "Moi... Lolita" (radio edit) — 3:40
 "Moi... Lolita" (single version) — 4:16
 "Moi... Lolita" (Lola extended remix) — 6:30
 "Moi... Lolita" (hello helli t'es a dance mix) — 5:50
 "Moi... Lolita" (Lolidub remix) — 3:45
 "Moi... Lolita" (the piano version) — 4:20

Charts

Weekly charts

Year-end charts

Decade-end charts

Certifications and sales

References

2000 debut singles
2000 songs
Alizée songs
Music videos directed by Laurent Boutonnat
Number-one singles in Italy
Number-one singles in Spain
Polydor Records singles
Sexuality and age in fiction
Songs with lyrics by Mylène Farmer
Songs with music by Laurent Boutonnat